Alexandra Feracci (born 10 October 1992) is a French karateka. She won one of the bronze medal in the women's individual kata event at the 2019 European Karate Championships held in Guadalajara, Spain.

She represented France at the 2020 Summer Olympics in Tokyo, Japan. She competed in the women's kata event.

Career 

She won one of the bronze medals in her event at the 2016 World University Karate Championships held in Braga, Portugal.

In 2018, she lost her bronze medal match in the women's individual kata event at the World Karate Championships in Madrid, Spain. She lost her bronze medal match in the women's individual kata event at the 2019 European Games held in Minsk, Belarus. In that same year, she also competed in the women's individual kata event at the 2019 World Beach Games held in Doha, Qatar without winning a medal.

She qualified at the World Olympic Qualification Tournament in Paris, France to represent France at the 2020 Summer Olympics in Tokyo, Japan. In the women's kata event, she finished in 4th place in the elimination round and she did not advance to compete in a medal match.

She won one of the bronze medals in the women's team kata event at the 2022 European Karate Championships held in Gaziantep, Turkey.

Personal life 

Her sister Laetitia Feracci also competes in karate.

Achievements

References

External links 

 

Living people
1992 births
Place of birth missing (living people)
French female karateka
Karateka at the 2019 European Games
European Games competitors for France
Karateka at the 2020 Summer Olympics
Olympic karateka of France
21st-century French women